Robinson may refer to:

People and names

 Robinson (name)

Fictional characters
 Robinson Crusoe, the main character, and title of a novel by Daniel Defoe, published in 1719

Geography
 Robinson projection, a map projection used since the 1960s to show the entire world in two dimensions
 Robinson (crater), a small lunar impact crater southwest of the large walled plain J. Herschel

United States
 Robinson, Illinois
 Robinson, Iowa
 Robinson, Kansas
 Robinson, Kentucky
 Robinson, Minnesota
 Robinson, North Dakota
 Robinson, Texas
 Robinson, Washington
 Robinson Township, Pennsylvania (disambiguation), two townships in the Pittsburgh Metro Area with the same name

United Kingdom
 Robinson (Lake District), a 737 m hill in England's Lake District
 Robinson College, Cambridge, a college in England's University of Cambridge

France
 Robinson (Paris RER), a commuter train station in Paris

Ships
USS Robinson, the name of more than one United States Navy ship
USS Jack C. Robinson (DE-671), a United States Navy destroyer escort converted during construction into the high-speed transport USS Jack C. Robinson (APD-72)
USS Jack C. Robinson (APD-72), a United States Navy high-speed transport in commission from 1945 to 1946

Businesses, products and manufacturers 
 Robinson Helicopter Company, a rotorcraft manufacturer.
 Robinson Knives, a series of folding knives produced by FACOSA S.A. Coutellerie, La Monnerie-le-Montel, Arrondissement de Thiers, France.
 Robinson Terminal Warehouse Corporation, a warehouse company based in Alexandria, Virginia, that owns warehouses in Virginia and Maryland and two deep-water shipping terminals on the Potomac River.
E. S. & A. Robinson, former paper and packaging manufacturer in Bristol, England.
Robinson Publishing Ltd, a UK publisher, now part of Constable & Robinson.
 Robinson Department Store, Thai-based department store chain
 Robinson & Co., a department store chain in Singapore and Malaysia, joint venture in Thailand with Central Group
 Robinson list, a list that contains addresses or phone numbers of people who do not want to be contacted by marketers
 Robinson–Patman Act, a U.S. law that prohibits anti-competitive practices by producers and specifically price discrimination.
 H. B. Robinson Nuclear Generating Station, a nuclear power plant in the U.S. state of South Carolina

Arts and entertainment
 I Robinson, the title used in Italy for The Cosby Show
 Robinson (artist), the German Illustrator Werner Kruse
 Robinson (TV series), the first worldwide production of the Survivor format

Books
 The Swiss Family Robinson, a novel published in 1812, about a Swiss family, shipwrecked on the way to Australia
 Robinson (novel), by Muriel Spark
 Robinson, a novel by Chris Petit.

Music
 "Robinson" (ja), a #1 hit song by Japanese rock band Spitz
 "Mrs. Robinson", a song by Simon and Garfunkel from 1968, featured in the film The Graduate

See also
 Robinson annulation, a chemical name reaction
 Robinsons (disambiguation)
 Robinsonade, a genre of stories about shipwrecked people
 Robert (disambiguation)
 Robin (disambiguation)
 Robison (disambiguation)
 Justice Robinson (disambiguation)